Martin Škoula (born October 28, 1979) is a Czech former professional ice hockey defenceman, who enjoyed a lengthy career in the National Hockey League (NHL) with the Colorado Avalanche, Mighty Ducks of Anaheim, Dallas Stars, Minnesota Wild, Pittsburgh Penguins and the New Jersey Devils. He won the Stanley Cup with the Colorado Avalanche in 2001.

Playing career 
Škoula was selected in the first round of the 1998 NHL Entry Draft, 17th overall, by the Colorado Avalanche. After playing two seasons in the Czech Republic, Škoula came over to North America in 1997, playing for the Barrie Colts of the OHL. His size and offensive ability made him an instant success. After only one game in the American Hockey League, with the Hershey Bears, Škoula joined the Avalanche.

In 2001, Škoula was a part of the Avalanche team that won the Stanley Cup. The following season, he played for his native country at the Salt Lake City Winter Olympics.

On February 21, 2004, Škoula was dealt by the Avalanche to the Mighty Ducks of Anaheim for Kurt Sauer and a 4th round pick (Raymond Macias). After playing 20 games with the Ducks, Škoula left as an unrestricted free agent. He spent the 2004 NHL Lockout in the Czech Extraliga with HC Litvínov.

On August 3, 2005, prior to the 2005–06 season, Škoula was signed by the Dallas Stars to a two-year contract. He stayed less than a season before he was dealt at the trade deadline by the Stars, along with Shawn Belle, to the Minnesota Wild for Willie Mitchell and a 2nd round pick.

On September 29, 2009, Škoula signed a one-year contract with the Pittsburgh Penguins for the 2009-10 season. Škoula played in 33 games with the Penguins as a reserve defenceman before he was included in a trade with prospect Luca Caputi to the Toronto Maple Leafs for Alexei Ponikarovsky on March 3, 2010. The same day, Škoula was then traded to the New Jersey Devils for a fifth-round pick in 2010.

On June 23, 2010, after 11 years in the NHL, Škoula returned to Europe signing a one-year contract with Russian team Avangard Omsk of the KHL. After one season in the KHL, Martin signed a new two-year contract with Avangard.

In the second year of his extension, after nine games in the 2012–13 season, Skoula was released by Omsk and was transferred to newcomer KHL Czech based, HC Lev Praha on September 27, 2012. After 21 games with Lev Praha for 7 points, Skoula was placed on the unprotected list and went unclaimed. He was then reassigned to join hometown club, HC Stadion Litoměřice, of the 1. národní hokejová liga on December 26, 2012.

On April 21, 2013, Skoula signed as a free agent to return to the KHL with HC Slovan Bratislava on a one-year contract. In the 2013–14 season, Skoula was one of only four Bratislava players to appear in every game with 54, helping contribute from the blueline with 13 points. He was unable to help elevate Slovan to the playoffs.

After signalling an intention to move closer to his native Litomerice at season's end, he returned to the Czech Extraliga signing a one-year contract with HC Bílí Tygři Liberec on May 27, 2014. Skoula featured in 10 games in Liberec, posting 2 goals and 7 points before ending his professional career.

Career statistics

Regular season and playoffs

International

Awards and honours

Transactions 
 June 27, 1998 - Škoula drafted by Colorado Avalanche
 February 21, 2004 - Škoula traded by Colorado to Anaheim Ducks in exchange for Kurt Sauer and a 4th round draft pick (Raymond Macias)
 August 3, 2005 - Škoula signs with Dallas Stars.
 March 9, 2006 - Škoula traded by Dallas along with Shawn Belle to the Minnesota Wild for Willie Mitchell and the Wild's second-round pick in the 2007 NHL Entry Draft.
 September 29, 2009 - Škoula signs a one-year deal with the Pittsburgh Penguins.
 March 3, 2010 - Škoula was traded by Pittsburgh to the Toronto Maple Leafs, along with teammate prospect Luca Caputi, for Alexei Ponikarovsky
 March 3, 2010 - Škoula was traded from the Toronto Maple Leafs to the New Jersey Devils for a fifth round pick in the 2010 NHL Entry Draft.

References

External links 
 

1979 births
Living people
People from Litoměřice
Avangard Omsk players
Barrie Colts players
HC Bílí Tygři Liberec players
Colorado Avalanche draft picks
Colorado Avalanche players
Czech ice hockey defencemen
Dallas Stars players
Hershey Bears players
HC Lev Praha players
HC Litvínov players
Mighty Ducks of Anaheim players
Minnesota Wild players
National Hockey League first-round draft picks
New Jersey Devils players
Pittsburgh Penguins players
HC Slovan Bratislava players
Stanley Cup champions
Ice hockey players at the 2002 Winter Olympics
Olympic ice hockey players of the Czech Republic
Sportspeople from the Ústí nad Labem Region
Czech expatriate ice hockey players in the United States
Czech expatriate ice hockey players in Canada
Czech expatriate ice hockey players in Russia
Czech expatriate ice hockey players in Slovakia